Hassan Aourid (born 1962) (Arabic: حسن أوريد) is a Moroccan writer. He was born in Errachidia. He has a PhD in political science and lectures at the Mohammed V University. He has published widely in both Arabic and French. He has written half a dozen novels: 
 Wistful Conversation (2015) 
 Morisco (published in French in 2011 and Arabic in 2017)
 Biography of a Donkey (2014)
 Sintra (2017) 
 Cordoba Spring (2017) 
 Mutanabbi's Rabat (2018)

Mutanabbi’s Rabat was nominated for the Arabic Booker Prize in 2020.

Early life
Hassan Aourid was born in Errachidia.

References

Moroccan novelists
Academic staff of Mohammed V University
Living people
1962 births